The women's 100 metre breaststroke event at the 2004 Olympic Games was contested at the Olympic Aquatic Centre of the Athens Olympic Sports Complex in Athens, Greece on August 15 and 16.

Chinese swimmer and triple world champion Luo Xuejuan won the gold medal in this event, with an Olympic record time of 1:06.64, missing the world record by 0.27 of a second. Australia's Brooke Hanson took home the silver at 1:07.15, while her teammate and world record holder Leisel Jones, who won silver as a 15-year-old in Sydney (2000), finished behind Hanson for a bronze medal by a hundredth of a second (0.01), with a time of 1:07.16. In 2007, Luo announced her official retirement from swimming, because of heart ailments that had plagued her and had caused fainting spells during her training.

Records
Prior to this competition, the existing world and Olympic records were as follows.

The following new world and Olympic records were set during this competition.

Results

Heats

Semifinals

Semifinal 1

Semifinal 2

Final

References

External links
Official Olympic Report

W
2004 in women's swimming
Women's events at the 2004 Summer Olympics